The Men's Greco-Roman 97 kg is a competition featured at the 2022 European Wrestling Championships, and was held in Budapest, Hungary  on April 2 and 3.

Medalists

Results 
 Legend
 F — Won by fall
 R — Retired

Final

Top half

Bottom half

Repechage

Final standing

References

External links
Draw

Men's greco-roman 97 kg